"(Forever) Live and Die" is a 1986 song by English electronic band Orchestral Manoeuvres in the Dark (OMD), released as the first single from their album The Pacific Age. Paul Humphreys sings lead vocals on the track. The single peaked at No. 11 on the UK Singles Chart. It was a top 10 hit in Canada and several European territories, and a top 20 hit in the United States, Australia, New Zealand, and Ireland.

Critical reception and legacy
Lynden Barber of The Sydney Morning Herald wrote that "(Forever) Live and Die" is "almost worthy of prime period ABBA, its ethereal Euro synthetics melting around a chorus that ascends towards heaven." Billboard selected the single as one of their "pop picks" for the week of 20 September, adding that it "achieves [the Beatles'] Magical Mystery Tour spirit with '80s tech". Record Mirrors Andy Strickland referred to "an infectious little beast" with "some nice brass touches". Conversely, Simon Mills of Smash Hits portrayed the song as "limp, languid, wimpy and totally inoffensive".

In April 1987, English DJ Gary Crowley identified "(Forever) Live and Die" as a "great single" and "one of [his] favourite records of the last twelve months". In a later article, Spins James Hunter observed "the kind of emotionally transcendent dancepop [Pet Shop Boys'] Neil Tennant always strove for, an unqualified masterpiece of tears and aural compression, carnivalesque synth figures and Wednesday afternoon blues." Stewart Mason of AllMusic wrote that it "sounds oddly unfinished, albeit pleasant enough". Barenaked Ladies drummer Tyler Stewart named the track as his favourite of OMD's, saying, "I really love '(Forever) Live and Die'. That's a great song."

KROQ ranked the track as the 44th-greatest of 1986; in a poll of 6,528 Slicing Up Eyeballs readers, it was voted the 68th-best of the year. The Pueblo Chieftains Jon Pompia named the "wonderful" song as one of the 10 greatest of the 1980s.

Track listing
7" and 7" picture disc
 "(Forever) Live and Die" – 3:36
 "This Town" – 3:44

First 12"
 "(Forever) Live and Die" (John "Tokes" Potoker - Extended Mix) – 5:45
 "(Forever) Live and Die" (7" version) – 3:36
 "This Town" – 3:44

Second 12"
 "(Forever) Live and Die" (Tom Lord-Alge - Extended Remix) – 5:50
 "(Forever) Live and Die" (7" version) – 3:36
 "This Town" – 3:44

Charts

Weekly charts

Year-end charts

References

External links
 

1986 songs
1986 singles
Orchestral Manoeuvres in the Dark songs
Songs written by Paul Humphreys
Virgin Records singles